Mario Suárez Mata (born 24 February 1987) is a Spanish professional footballer who plays for Rayo Vallecano as a defensive midfielder.

He amassed La Liga totals of 234 matches and 14 goals over 12 seasons, representing mainly in the competition Atlético Madrid and winning six major titles with the club, including the 2014 national championship and the 2012 Europa League.

Suarez played 38 times for Spain at youth level, making his debut for the full side in 2013.

Club career

Atlético Madrid
A product of Atlético Madrid's youth system, Suárez was born in Alcobendas, Madrid. He first appeared with the first team on 6 November 2005, playing four minutes in a 0–0 draw at Sevilla FC and going on to make a further three La Liga appearances during the season, including two 90-minute games.

From 2006 to 2008, Suárez served two Segunda División loan stints, being an important element in Real Valladolid's 2007 top flight return and spending his second year at RC Celta de Vigo. In August 2008 he was purchased by RCD Mallorca, signing a four-year deal that left Atlético the possibility of reacquiring the player.

After two seasons appearing regularly (in the second, he scored five goals in 34 matches to help the Balearic Islands side qualify for the UEFA Europa League), the rebuy clause was activated, and Suárez returned to the Colchoneros. In his debut campaign in his second spell, he battled for first-choice status at holding midfielder with Brazilian Paulo Assunção. He netted his first official goal for the club on 10 April 2011, in a 3–0 home win against Real Sociedad.

On 10 August 2014, Suárez was knocked unconscious in a friendly against VfL Wolfsburg, after teammate Cristian Ansaldi's hip hit his head. He suffered a "traumatic brain injury" and stayed for treatment in Germany, while the rest of the team returned to Spain. However, on 19 August, he played the entire first leg of the Supercopa de España, a 1–1 draw away to Real Madrid.

Suárez scored his second competitive goal of 2014–15 on 17 March 2015, through a 27th-minute deflected effort for the only goal against Bayer 04 Leverkusen in the UEFA Champions League's round-of-16. He also converted his penalty shootout attempt, in an eventual 3–2 win.

Fiorentina
On 24 July 2015, Suárez signed for Serie A club ACF Fiorentina, with Stefan Savić moving in the opposite direction. He appeared in only 13 competitive games during his six-month tenure, his maiden league appearance occurring on 23 August in a 2–0 home victory over A.C. Milan (23 minutes played). 

Suárez's sole goal for the Viola came on 1 November 2015, in a 4–1 rout of Frosinone Calcio.

Watford
On 30 January 2016, after weeks of negotiations, Watford announced the signing of Suárez on a four-and-a-half-year contract, for a €4 million transfer fee. His first Premier League appearance occurred four days later, as he came on as an 87th-minute substitute for Étienne Capoue in a 0–0 home draw against Chelsea.

Suárez signed for Valencia CF on a season-long loan deal on 16 August 2016, with an option of a subsequent purchase. He scored his first brace as a senior on 16 October, in a 2–1 victory at Sporting de Gijón.

Later years
On 11 July 2017, Suárez transferred to Chinese Super League side Guizhou Hengfeng Zhicheng FC. He returned to Spain on 31 January 2019, joining Rayo Vallecano on a six-month contract.

International career
Suárez played for Spain in the 2007 FIFA U-20 World Cup in Canada. He scored a penalty in the match against Zambia, in a 2–1 win. Subsequently, he appeared for the under-21s at the 2009 UEFA European Championship in Sweden, in an eventual group stage exit.

On 6 February 2013, Suárez earned his first cap with the full side, playing the last 20 minutes of the 3–1 friendly win over Uruguay in Doha, Qatar.

Personal life
In June 2017, Suárez married model Malena Costa Sjögren.

Career statistics

Club

International

Honours
Valladolid
Segunda División: 2006–07

Atlético Madrid
La Liga: 2013–14
Copa del Rey: 2012–13
Supercopa de España: 2014; Runner-up 2013
UEFA Europa League: 2011–12
UEFA Super Cup: 2010, 2012
UEFA Champions League runner-up: 2013–14

Spain U19
UEFA European Under-19 Championship: 2006

References

External links

1987 births
Living people
People from Alcobendas
Spanish footballers
Footballers from the Community of Madrid
Association football midfielders
La Liga players
Segunda División players
Segunda División B players
Atlético Madrid B players
Atlético Madrid footballers
Real Valladolid players
RC Celta de Vigo players
RCD Mallorca players
Valencia CF players
Rayo Vallecano players
Serie A players
ACF Fiorentina players
Premier League players
Watford F.C. players
Chinese Super League players
Guizhou F.C. players
UEFA Europa League winning players
Spain youth international footballers
Spain under-21 international footballers
Spain international footballers
Spanish expatriate footballers
Expatriate footballers in Italy
Expatriate footballers in England
Expatriate footballers in China
Spanish expatriate sportspeople in Italy
Spanish expatriate sportspeople in England
Spanish expatriate sportspeople in China